The Garretson School District is a public school district in Minnehaha County,
based in Garretson, South Dakota.

Schools
The Garretson School District has one elementary school, one middle school, and one high school.

Elementary school
Garretson elemantry

Middle school
Garretson Middle School

High school
Garretson High School

References

External links

School districts in South Dakota
Education in Minnehaha County, South Dakota